Dark Orange is an ethereal wave band from Hamburg, Germany and is probably best known for their gothic rendition of Paul Simon's "Sounds of Silence".

History 
Dark Orange's last release with Hyperium Records, "The Sea Is My Soul", taken from their album The Garden of Poseidon, was released under the alias 24 Hours and drastically remixed by Mark Tibenham of And Also the Trees.

The band went relatively unknown to American audiences, until 1998 when Cleopatra Records released "The Sea Is My Soul" (as 24 Hours) on the compilation Heavenly Voices.

Dark Orange announced a reunion in 2008. In 2009, a single followed and the band announced that a new album would be released in May, 2010 on the Kalinkaland label, produced by Folker Alberts and Mastered by Robin Guthrie of the Cocteau Twins. Guest musicians on the album included Steven Burrows (Bass) and Emer Brizzolara (Dulcimer, drums).

Discography

Albums and EPs

Singles

Promotional Music Videos

Compilations

References

Discogs The most complete and authoritative music discography.
Eyesore The web's largest Industrial/Gothic music index.

Ethereal wave musical groups
German gothic rock groups
German musical groups